Hypothetical zeolites are combinatorial models of potential structures of the minerals known as zeolites.  They are four-regular periodic graphs, with vertices representing the tetrahedral atom (usually Si or Al) and the edges representing the bridging oxygen atoms. Alternatively, by ignoring the tetrahedral atoms, zeolites can be represented by a six-valent periodic graph of oxygen atoms, with each O-O edge defining an edge of a tetrahedron.

At present there are millions of hypothetical zeolite frameworks known.  For any fixed number of vertices, these are a small fraction of possible 4-regular periodic graphs, because the geometric constraints imposed by the chemistry of zeolites rules out most possibilities.

Enumeration methods
There are several methods for enumerating zeolite frameworks. The method of Earl et al. uses simulated annealing to arrange a fixed number of tetrahedral atoms under periodic symmetry constraints. The method of Treacy and Rivin  uses combinatorial enumeration to identify four-valent graphs under fixed symmetry and fixed number of tetrahedral atoms. This is then followed by a simulated annealing embedding of the candidate graph into the 3-dimensional torus. Ockwig et al. tile polyhedra to fill space and generate four-valent graphs.

Open questions
There many open questions, among them:
 Why there is such a large discrepancy between the number of hypothetical zeolites and the number of zeolite frameworks observed in nature?
 Can the pore structure of a hypothetical zeolite be predicted only from its periodic graph?

References

External links
 Atlas of Prospective Zeolite Structures
 Zeolite Project as ASU/Temple

Zeolites